Wriggleswade Dam is a combined gravity and arch type dam located on the Kubusi River near Stutterheim, Eastern Cape, South Africa. It was established in 1991 and serves primarily for municipal and industrial water supply purposes. The hazard potential of the dam has been ranked high (3).

See also
List of reservoirs and dams in South Africa
List of rivers of South Africa

References 

 List of South African Dams from the Department of Water Affairs

Dams in South Africa
Dams completed in 1991
1991 establishments in South Africa